The Eighteenth Texas Legislature met from January 9, 1883 to February 6, 1884 in its regular session and one called session. All members of the House of Representatives and about half of the members of the Senate were elected in the 1882 general election.

Sessions
18th Regular session: January 9–April 13, 1883
18th First called session: January 8–February 6, 1884

Party summary

Officers

Senate
 Lieutenant Governor
 Francis Marion Martin, Democrat
 President pro tempore
 Augustus W. Houston, Democrat, Regular session
 Samuel Bronson Cooper, Democrat, ad interim, First called session

House of Representatives
 Speaker of the House
 Charles Reese Gibson, Democrat

Members
Members of the Eighteenth Texas Legislature as of the beginning of the Regular Session, January 9, 1883:

Senate

House of Representatives

Benjamin M. Baker
William John Caven
R. J. Evans
George Finlay
George Washington Lafayette Fly
Lafayette Lumpkin Foster
Charles Reese Gibson
Andrew Jackson Harris
William Kercheval Homan
Joseph Chappell Hutcheson
Robert A. Kerr
Absolom C. Oliver
George C. Pendleton—District 24
Thomas A. Rodríguez
George Robertson Reeves
Benjamin Dudley Tarlton
George T. Todd
Arthur Tompkins
John Henry Traylor
James W. Truitt
William Wallace Weatherred
Charles Louis Wurzbach
G. W. Wyatt
Alexander John Leo

Membership changes

External links

18th Texas Legislature
1883 in Texas
1884 in Texas
1883 U.S. legislative sessions
1884 U.S. legislative sessions